Abbey of St Victor may refer to:
 Abbey of St Victor, Marseille
 Abbey of Saint-Victor, Paris
 abbey and namesake of Saint-Victor-l'Abbaye